Hoseyn Qoli (also Romanized as Ḩoseyn Qolī; also known as Ḩasan Qolī) is a village in Howmeh Rural District, in the Central District of Bam County, Kerman Province, Iran. At the 2006 census, its population was 32, in 8 families.

References 

Populated places in Bam County